Alexandre Mendy may refer to:

 Alexandre Mendy (footballer, born 1983), French football rightback
 Alexandre Mendy (footballer, born 1994), Bissau-Guinean football striker